NA-147 Khanewal-IV is a constituency for the National Assembly of Pakistan.

Election 2002 

General elections were held on 10 Oct 2002. Malik Ghulam Murtaza of PML-Q won by 80,688 votes.

Election 2008 

General elections were held on 18 Feb 2008. Chaudhry Iftikhar Nazir of PPP won by 78,225 votes.

Election 2013 

General elections were held on 11 May 2013. Chaudhry Iftikhar Nazir of PML-N won by 116,903 votes and became the  member of National Assembly.

Election 2018

See also
NA-146 Khanewal-III
NA-148 Multan-I

References

External links 
Election result's official website

Constituencies of Punjab, Pakistan